KTMT (580 kHz) is an AM radio station broadcasting a sports format. Licensed to Ashland, Oregon, US, the station serves the greater Medford-Ashland area.  The station, originally established in 1946, is currently owned by Stephens Media Group, through licensee SMG-Medford, LLC.

History
The station was launched in 1946 as KWIN on a frequency of 1400 kHz, broadcasting with 250 watts of power. In 1962, the station shifted to the 580 kHz frequency and upgraded to 1,000 watts of broadcast power. In 1972, the station changed its callsign to KCMX. On January 1, 1999, the station changed its call sign to KTMT.  On January 31, 2008, the station changed its call sign to KGAY, and had a Regional Mexican format. On August 19, 2010, the station changed its call sign back to KTMT. On October 4, 2010 KTMT changed their format back to sports and is the home of CBS Sports Radio for the area.

High school coverage with KDRV 12+
In September 2011, KTMT and Radio Medford started a working relationship with KDRV NewsWatch 12+ (Channel 12.2 over-the-air and channel 291 on Charter Cable in the Rogue Valley) with simulcast coverage of the "Friday Night Blitz Game Of The Week" during the high school football season and the "Roundball Wrap Game Of The Week" during the high school basketball season.  Radio Medford's Bill Jacobs is joined by KDRV's Chris Leone and Brandon Kamerman.  (Chris Breece was a part of the broadcast team from 2011 to 2012.)

Various Southern Oregon high schools are covered.  However, games involving such high schools as North Medford High School, South Medford High School, Ashland High School, Crater High School and Cascade Christian High School are not broadcast on KTMT due to those schools' commitments with other radio stations.

Translator
KTMT also broadcasts on the following FM translator:

References

External links

FCC History Cards for KTMT

Ashland, Oregon
TMT
Sports radio stations in the United States
Radio stations established in 1946
1946 establishments in Oregon